Ladder scheme may refer to:

 Relay Ladder Logic, a ladder logic flow chart
 Matrix scheme, a controversial (and in some places illegal) business model